Delilah is a Canadian situation comedy television series which aired on CBC Television from 1973 to 1974.

Premise
Delilah marked the CBC's first situation comedy in prime-time, having aired its previous sitcom Toby in daytime.

Delilah (Terry Tweed) moves out of the city and becomes a small community's first female barber. Her barbershop was intended to be given to her younger brother Vincent (Miles McNamara), but he must first graduate from school.

Other series characters include Delilah's Aunt Peggy (Barbara Hamilton), the town's newspaper editor T.J. (Eric House), family friend Franny Tree (Peter Mews), Frances (Kay Hawtrey), Mavis (Joyce Gordon) and Isabel (Paulle Clark).

Production
Delilah was recorded before a live studio audience. Six of the episodes were written by Bryan Barney under script editor Jean Templeton.

Scheduling
This half-hour series was broadcast on Thursdays at 9:00 p.m. (Eastern) from 4 October 1973 to 3 January 1974.

Reception
The series generally received poor reviews and negative audience reception. It was cancelled after a single 13-episode season. However, CBC's next sitcom, King of Kensington, fared much better and became a multi-year success. Toronto Star television critic Jim Bawden declared the series as "Worst Canadian Sitcom", declaring the scriptwriting to be "appalling" and discovered an absence of laughter from the audience when he attended a taping of an episode.

References

External links

 
 

CBC Television original programming
1973 Canadian television series debuts
1974 Canadian television series endings
1970s Canadian sitcoms